Tălpaș is a commune in Dolj County, Oltenia, Romania with a population of 1,512 people. It is composed of five villages: Moflești, Nistoi, Puținei, Soceni and Tălpaș. These were part of Fărcaș Commune until 2004, when they were split off.

References

Communes in Dolj County
Localities in Oltenia